Wenham is a town in Essex County, Massachusetts. The population was 4,979 at the time of the 2020 census.

The town of Wenham, originally settled in 1635 and incorporated in 1643, has retained much of its historic character and rural scenery. It is a town of many open views of farm lands, lakes, woodlands, historic homes and old stone walls that accompany its winding tree-lined roads.

Wenham is closely tied to its neighboring town, Hamilton, sharing a school system, library, recreation department, commuter rail station and newspaper. In 2010, the community of Hamilton-Wenham was listed among the "Best Places to Live" by Boston magazine.

History

Wenham was first settled in 1635 and officially incorporated in 1643.

English settlers first came to Wenham in the 1630s, but the area had been home to Native Americans for thousands of years. At the time of contact, the area was inhabited by the Agawam, an Eastern Algonquian people whose numbers were greatly reduced by a massive epidemic, probably smallpox, in 1617–1619. 

When three grandchildren of Agawam sachem Masconomet pressed their claim to the lands of Wenham, Beverly, and Manchester in 1700, Wenham selectmen paid them three pounds and ten shillings for the quitclaim. Until recent years, indigenous artifacts were found frequently throughout Wenham, and a representative collection is in the possession of the Wenham Museum. 

Wenham was originally a part of Salem. Hugh Peters, the minister in Salem, preached to a group on a hill by the Great Pond around 1638, most probably to encourage settlement. The earliest land grants in the Wenham area roughly coincide with Peters' sermon. The hill was leveled in later years to make room for the ice industry at the Great Pond.

In September 1643, the General Court of Massachusetts granted that Wenham should be a town in its own right and send a representative to the General Court. It was the first town to be set off from Salem. Because many of its early settlers came from Suffolk County in England, it is presumed that the name of the town derives from two small villages there—Great Wenham and Little Wenham. Wenham means "home on the moor". A church was formed in October 1644, with John Fiske as pastor and seven families as members.

In those early days, the church and government were one. A small part of the population—those who were church members—controlled both civil and religious life. It was not until 1833 that an amendment to the Massachusetts Constitution separated church and town.

Wenham provided volunteers in King Philip's War in the 1670s, and the French and Indian War in the mid 1700s. In 1774, the town voted to select 15 men as minutemen, and from that time on Loyalists were not welcome in Wenham.

The Industrial Revolution, which changed the face of many Massachusetts towns in the 19th century, passed Wenham by. It remained a small community, with one notable exception. Wenham's ice industry brought the name of Wenham to the notice of people as far away as London, where hotels in the 1850s advertised: "We serve Wenham Lake Ice." Artificial refrigeration and a fire that destroyed the ice house in 1973 brought an end to this unique industry.

Although slaves were owned by Wenham residents in the 18th century, by the 1850s sentiment was fervently in favor of abolition. Between 1862 and 1865, the army camp, Camp Landers, occupied  in Wenham. Part of this tract is now Pingree Field. There were accommodations for two full regiments of Union soldiers with barracks, mess halls, and training fields.

In 1909, Henry Clay Frick, a steel magnate, bought the present-day Iron Rail property so that his daughter Helen could create a vacation home for the mill girls throughout New England. Helen Frick transferred the Iron Rail Vacation Home to the Girls' Clubs of America in 1954, and the town of Wenham bought the property in the 1970s.

Two other Wenham landmarks, the Tea House and the Wenham Museum, have their roots in the Wenham Village Improvement Society. A group of ladies organized the society in 1893 to make Wenham more beautiful by planting more shade trees. They purchased Mr. Henry Hobb's harness shop as a home for a tea house and exchange for selling ladies' handiwork, jams and jellies. The Tea House and Exchange has continued through the years as the successful fundraising arm of the Wenham Village Improvement Society.

In 1921, the Historical Committee of the Wenham Village Improvement Society encouraged the society to buy the 17th-century Claflin-Richards house at the center of town. They did so, and eventually added "the Barn" (which would become Burnham Hall) and the museum. The Wenham Historical Association and Museum became independent from the Village Improvement Society and underwent a major renovation and expansion in 1997.

Geography and transportation
Wenham Lake lies within the town and in neighboring Beverly, and several other smaller ponds lie within town. A stretch of the Salem Beverly Waterway Canal passes through town as well, and the southernmost portion of the Ipswich River Wildlife Sanctuary lies in the western part of town.

Wenham is bordered on the south by Beverly, on the east by Manchester-by-the-Sea, on the north by Hamilton, on the northwest by Topsfield, and on the west by Danvers. The eastern end of Wenham is crossed by Massachusetts Route 128, with one exit within town. Route 1A crosses through the center of town, with Route 22 crossing through the east and Route 97 crossing the southwest corner of town. Route 35 ends at Route 97 just over the Topsfield town line. 

Wenham lies along the Newburyport section of the Newburyport/Rockport Line of the MBTA Commuter Rail. There are no stations within town, but the Hamilton/Wenham station lies just north of town, and the North Beverly station lies south of town in Beverly. The tip of the north runway of Beverly Municipal Airport lies just within town; the nearest national and international air service is located at Boston's Logan International Airport.

Demographics

As of the census of 2000, there were 4,440 people, 1,285 households, and 957 families residing in the town. The racial makeup of the town was 97.84% White, 0.43% African American, 0.02% Native American, 1.35% Asian, 0.07% from other races, and 0.29% from two or more races. Hispanic or Latino of any race were 0.59% of the population.

There were 1,285 households, out of which 37.6% had children under the age of 18 living with them, 66.5% were married couples living together, 5.9% had a female householder with no husband present, and 25.5% were non-families. Of all households 22.5% were made up of individuals, and 15.6% had someone living alone who was 65 years of age or older. The average household size was 2.70 and the average family size was 3.19.

In the town, the population was spread out, with 22.0% under the age of 18, 23.6% from 18 to 24, 19.8% from 25 to 44, 20.5% from 45 to 64, and 14.1% who were 65 years of age or older. The median age was 34 years. For every 100 females, there were 82.4 males. For every 100 females age 18 and over, there were 80.3 males.

The median income for a household in the town was $90,524, and the median income for a family was $98,004. Males had a median income of $76,639 versus $43,750 for females. The per capita income for the town was $36,812. About 1.2% of families and 3.3% of the population were below the poverty line, including 1.9% of those under age 18 and 5.1% of those age 65 or over.

Education 

Wenham is home to Gordon College, a private four-year Christian college.

The Academy at Penguin Hall is located in Wenham. It is an independent, all-girls college preparatory secondary school. Girls in grades 9–12 attend the school.

Wenham is part of the Hamilton-Wenham Regional School District. The town has one public elementary school, the Buker school. Middle school students attend Miles River Middle School, and high school students attend Hamilton-Wenham Regional High School.

Points of interest
 Wenham Museum (1922)
 Claflin-Richards House (1690)
 Grand Wenham Canal (1917)
 Newman-Fiske-Dodge House (1658)
 Wenham Lake
 The Academy at Penguin Hall

Notable people
Paul Harding, Pulitzer Prize–winning author of Tinkers
Bob Stanley, former Red Sox relief pitcher

See also

References

External links

 Town of Wenham official website
 Hamilton-Wenham Public Library, in South Hamilton
 Hamilton-Wenham Chronicle, local newspaper
 Wenham Museum
 Wenham Village Improvement Society
 
 Anderson, Philader. 1831 Map of Wenham
 Beers, D.G. 1872 Atlas of Essex County. Map of Wenham. plate 95.
 Walker, George H. 1884 Atlas of Essex County.Map of Wenham plate 87.
 Old USGS maps of Wenham
 Frederic Tudor and the Massachusetts Ice Exchange, 10-minute video by Robby Griffin, Nick Hamlin, Eric Lundquist, created 2004. Mentions the high quality of the ice from Wenham.

 
1643 establishments in Massachusetts
Populated places established in 1635